Demetrio Neyra Ramos (15 December 1908 - 27 September 1957) was a Peruvian football forward who played for Peru in the 1930 FIFA World Cup. He also played for Alianza Lima.

References

External links

FIFA profile

1908 births
1957 deaths
Peruvian footballers
Peru international footballers
Association football forwards
Peruvian Primera División players
Peruvian Segunda División players
Club Alianza Lima footballers
1930 FIFA World Cup players